A Handful of Darkness is a collection of science fiction and fantasy stories by American writer Philip K. Dick.  It was first published by Rich & Cowan in 1955 and was Dick's first hardcover book.

The stories originally appeared in the magazines Galaxy Science Fiction, Astounding Stories, The Magazine of Fantasy & Science Fiction, Fantastic Universe, If, Amazing Stories, Imagination, Fantastic Story Magazine, Science Fiction Stories, Beyond Fantasy Fiction and Fantasy Fiction.

Contents

 "Colony"
 "Impostor"
 "Expendable"
 "Planet for Transients"
 "Prominent Author"
 "The Builder"
 "The Little Movement"
 "The Preserving Machine"
 "The Impossible Planet"
 "The Indefatigable Frog"
 "The Turning Wheel"
 "Progeny"
 "Upon the Dull Earth"
 "The Cookie Lady"
 "Exhibit Piece"

Notes

References

1955 short story collections
Fantasy short story collections
Short story collections by Philip K. Dick
Rich & Cowan books